Bubikon is a railway station in the Swiss canton of Zurich and municipality of Bubikon. The station is located on the Wallisellen to Uster and Rapperswil railway line.

Services 
The station is served by Zurich S-Bahn lines S5 and S15. During weekends, there is also a nighttime S-Bahn service (SN5) offered by ZVV.

Summary of all S-Bahn services:

 Zürich S-Bahn:
 : half-hourly service to  via , and to  via .
 Nighttime S-Bahn (only during weekends):

History 
Bubikon was formerly a junction point with the Uerikon to Bauma railway (UeBB), which diverged from the Wallisellen to Rapperswil line at either end of the station. The UeBB to the south, originally to Uerikon, was still in use as a freight siding as far as Wolfhausen for many years, but as of 2018 this section is no longer connected to the main railway network. The UeBB to the north, originally to Hinwil and Bauma, has been abandoned as far as Hinwil.

References

External links 

 

Bubikon
Bubikon
Bubikon